Kévin Olivier Soni (born 17 April 1998) is a Cameroonian professional footballer who plays as an attacking midfielder for Turkish club Adana Demirspor and the Cameroon national team.

Club career 
Soni was born in Douala, but moved to France at early age. A FC Girondins de Bordeaux youth graduate, he made his first team debut at 21 January 2015 by replacing Nicolas Maurice-Belay in a 1–2 Coupe de France defeat against Paris Saint-Germain FC. On 8 September 2016, he was loaned to Pau FC for one year.

On 21 July 2017, Soni signed for Girona FC, being immediately assigned to the farm team in Segunda División B. The following 22 January, he extended his contract until 2022.

On 8 April 2018, Soni made his first team – and La Liga – debut, coming on as a late substitute for Portu in a 0–5 loss against Real Sociedad. On 31 August of the following year, after Girona's relegation, he was loaned to RCD Espanyol's reserves in the third division, for one year.

On 27 August 2020, Soni agreed to a one-year loan deal with another reserve team, Villarreal CF B also in division three. The following 2 February, he moved to fellow league team Celta de Vigo B, while still owned by Girona.

On 16 June 2021, Soni signed a three-year deal with the Greek Superleague club Asteras Tripolis FC. On 27 November 2021, Soni scored a brace and gave two assists, helping his club prevailed over Atromitos FC 6–2 for Super League, making one of his best appearances with Milan Rastavac on its bench.He was voted man of the match for his performance.

International career
Soni debuted with the Cameroon national team in a 1–0 2022 World Cup qualification loss to Algeria on 25 March 2022.

Career statistics

Club

Honours

Individual
Asteras Tripolis Player of the Season: 2021–22

References

External links

1998 births
Living people
Footballers from Douala
Cameroonian footballers
Cameroon international footballers
Association football midfielders
Ligue 1 players
Championnat National players
Championnat National 2 players
Championnat National 3 players
Super League Greece players
Süper Lig players
FC Girondins de Bordeaux players
Pau FC players
La Liga players
Segunda División B players
CF Peralada players
Girona FC players
RCD Espanyol B footballers
RCD Espanyol footballers
Villarreal CF B players
Celta de Vigo B players
Asteras Tripolis F.C. players
Hatayspor footballers
Cameroon under-20 international footballers
Cameroonian expatriate footballers
Cameroonian expatriate sportspeople in France
Cameroonian expatriate sportspeople in Spain
Cameroonian expatriate sportspeople in Greece
Cameroonian expatriate sportspeople in Turkey
Expatriate footballers in France
Expatriate footballers in Spain
Expatriate footballers in Greece
Expatriate footballers in Turkey